Ioannis Kousoulos (born 14 June 1996 in Limassol) is a professional Cypriot football player who plays for Omonia in the Cypriot First Division.

Career
Born in Limassol, Kousoulos signed his first professional contract with Nea Salamina at the age of 18.

On 3 July 2018, Kousoulos joined Omonia on a four-year contract. In August 2020, he renewed his contract until 2024.

Kousoulos started the vast majority of Omonia's games in the 2020-21 season, in which he helped his team win the domestic league, and was named Omonia's vice-captain. He was given the nickname "Machine" by then Omonia coach Henning Berg.

On 20 July 2021, Kousoulos sustained a knee cartilage injury in a Champions League qualifier against Dinamo Zagreb, which kept him out of action for the entirety of the 2021-22 season. He made his return on 3 September 2022, coming on as a substitute in a 3-2 home win against AEK Larnaca in the Cypriot League.

Personal life
On 24 June 2022, his wife Dorina Antoniou gave birth to their son Michael.

Career statistics

Club

International

International goals
Scores and results list Cyprus' goal tally first.

Honours
Omonia
Cypriot First Division: 2020–21
Cypriot Cup: 2021–22
Cypriot Super Cup: 2021

References

External links

1994 births
Living people
Cypriot footballers
Association football defenders
Nea Salamis Famagusta FC players
Cypriot First Division players
Cyprus under-21 international footballers
Cyprus youth international footballers
Cyprus international footballers